Nathalie Loiseau (born 1 June 1964) is a French politician, diplomat and academic administrator who has served as a Member of European Parliament since 2019. Previously she was director of the École nationale d'administration (ENA) from 2012 to 2017 and as the French Minister for European Affairs from 21 June 2017 to 27 March 2019. She was the top candidate of the La République En Marche electoral list in the 2019 European elections.

Early life
Nathalie Loiseau was born on 1 June 1964 in Neuilly-sur-Seine, France. Her father was a corporate consultant in mergers and acquisitions.

Loiseau graduated from Sciences Po in 1983. In 1984, she appeared on a list of candidates for a students' union linked to the far-right Groupe Union Défense. She also studied Chinese language at the Institut national des langues et civilisations orientales.

Career in diplomacy

Loiseau joined the French foreign service in 1986. She served as a diplomat in Indonesia from 1990 to 1992. She was an advisor to Foreign Minister Alain Juppé from 1993 to 1995. She later served diplomatic missions in Dakar, Senegal and Rabat, Morocco. She served as the Communications Director at the Embassy of France, Washington, D.C. from 2002 to 2007. She was the head of Human Resources at the Ministry of Foreign Affairs from 2009 to 2011, and as its chief of staff from 2011 to 2012.

Loiseau was the director of the École nationale d'administration (ENA) between 2012 and 2017.

Political career
On 21 June 2017, Loiseau succeeded Marielle de Sarnez as the French Minister for European Affairs.

Louiseau has been a Member of the European Parliament since the 2019 European elections. She has since been a member of the Committee on Foreign Affairs and the chairwoman of its Subcommittee on Security and Defence. In 2020, she also joined the Special Committee on Foreign Interference in all Democratic Processes in the European Union.

In addition to her committee assignments, Loiseau is part of the Parliament's delegations for relations with the Maghreb countries and the Arab Maghreb Union; to the Parliamentary Assembly of the Union for the Mediterranean; and for relations with the NATO Parliamentary Assembly. She is also a member of the European Parliament Intergroup on Children’s Rights the European Parliament Intergroup on LGBT Rights and the MEPs Against Cancer group. Since 2021, she has been chairing the Parliament's delegation to the EU-UK Parliamentary Assembly, which provides parliamentary oversight over the implementation of the EU–UK Trade and Cooperation Agreement.

Political positions
In a 2022 letter to European Commissioner for the Environment, Oceans and Fisheries Virginijus Sinkevičius, Loiseau – together with Pierre Karleskind and Stéphanie Yon-Courtin – urged the EU to take measures to end British water treatment facilities’ discharges of raw sewage into shared waters, part of what they argued was an unacceptable lowering of environmental standards since Brexit.

Also in 2022, Loiseau and Bart Groothuis wrote a letter to local officials in Strasbourg, criticizing a deal between Chinese technology company Nuctech and Strasbourg Airport to provide airport scanning systems, arguing the firm would get access to data on its travelers, including EU lawmakers.

Personal life
Loiseau is married and has four children. She is a Roman Catholic, and a feminist.

In March 2019, Loiseau posted a joke to her private Facebook page about owning a cat which she had named 'Brexit', saying that "He wakes me up every morning meowing to death because he wants to go out, and then when I open the door he stays put, undecided, and then glares at me when I put him out." The quote was reprinted by Le Journal du Dimanche, and in response to the widespread international media coverage Loiseau clarified that she does not own a cat, and her comments were intended as a joke.

Works

References

1964 births
Living people
21st-century French women politicians
French non-fiction writers
French Roman Catholics
La République En Marche! politicians
Lycée Carnot alumni
MEPs for France 2019–2024
People from Neuilly-sur-Seine
Politicians from Île-de-France
Sciences Po alumni
Women government ministers of France
National Institute for Oriental Languages and Civilizations people